This is the list of government agencies in Brunei.

Ministries 
Brunei, at present, has the following ministries:

Prime Minister's Office (PMO)
 Ministry of Finance and Economy (MOFE)
 Ministry of Defence (MINDEF)
Ministry Foreign Affairs (MFA)
 Ministry of Home Affairs (MOHA)
 Ministry of Education (MOE)
 Ministry of Primary Resources and Tourism (MPRT)
 Ministry of Development (MOD)
 Ministry of Culture, Youth and Sports (MCYS)
 Ministry of Health (MOH)
 Ministry of Religious Affairs (MORA)
 Ministry of Communications (MINCOM)
 Ministry of Energy, Manpower and Industry (MEMI)

Agencies

Prime Minister's Office 
Prime Minister's Office, having status of a ministry, comprises the following agencies:

Anti Corruption Bureau (BMR)
Attorney-General's Chambers (AGC)
Audit Department
Civil Service Institute (IPA)
Councils of State
Department of Economic Planning and Development (JPKE)
Government Printing Department
Information Department
Internal Security Department (KDN )
Management Services Department (MSD)
Narcotics Control Bureau (BKN)
Public Service Commission (SPA)
Public Service Department (PSD)
 Royal Brunei Police Force (PPDB)
 Radio Television Brunei (RTB)
Royal Customs and Traditions Department
State Judiciary
State Mufti Department (JMK)

Ministry of Finance 
The Ministry comprises the following agencies:

 Royal Customs and Excise Department
 State Supply and Storage Department
 Treasury Department

Ministry of Defence 
The Ministry comprises the following agencies, but not limited to:

 Royal Brunei Armed Forces (ABDB)
 Sultan Haji Hassanal Bolkiah Institute of Defence and Strategic Studies (SHHBIDSS)

Ministry of Foreign Affairs and Trade 
No agency under this Ministry

Ministry of Home Affairs 
The Ministry comprises the following agencies:

 District Offices (Belait, Brunei-Muara, Temburong and Tutong)
 Fire and Rescue Department
 Immigration and National Registration Department (JIPK)
 Labour Department
 Municipal Boards (Bandar Seri Begawan, Kuala Belait and Seria, and Tutong)
 National Disaster Management Centre (NDMC)
 Prison Department

Ministry of Education 
No agency under this Ministry

Ministry of Primary Resources and Tourism 
The Ministry comprises the following agencies:

 Agriculture and Agrifood Department
 Fisheries Department
 Forestry Department
 Tourism Development Department

Ministry of Development 
The Ministry comprises the following agencies:

 Housing Development Department (HDD)
 Environment, Parks and Recreation Department (JASTRE)
 Land Department
 Public Works Department (JKRB)
 Survey Department
 Town and Country Planning Department (JPBD)

Ministry of Culture, Youth and Sports 
The Ministry comprises the following agencies:

 Community Development Department (JAPEM)
 History Centre
 Language and Literature Department (DBP)
 Museum Department
 National Service Programme (PKBN)
 Youth and Sports Department

Ministry of Health 
No agency under this Ministry

Ministry of Religious Affairs 
The Ministry comprises the following agencies, but not limited to:

 Seri Begawan Religious Teachers University College (KUPU SB)
 Sultan Haji Hassanal Bolkiah Tahfiz al-Quran Institute (ITQSHHB)

Ministry of Communications 
The Ministry  comprises the following agencies:

 Department of Civil Aviation (DCA)
 Land Transport Department (JPD)
 Meteorological Department (MET Brunei)
 Postal Services Department

Ministry of Energy and Industry 
The Ministry comprises the following agencies:

 Department of Electrical Services (DES)
 e-Government National Centre (eGNC)

Notes

References

External links 

 Government of Brunei

Government of Brunei
Politics of Brunei
Brunei
Government